Monkey Grip may refer to:

 Monkey Grip (Bill Wyman album), 1974
 Monkey Grip (novel), 1977 novel by Helen Garner
 Monkey Grip (film), 1982 Australian film, based on the novel
 Monkey Grip (soundtrack), a soundtrack by the Divinyls to the above film